Die Sprache is a peer-reviewed academic journal that was established in 1949. It contains articles on historical and comparative linguistics, especially of Indo-European languages. The main focus is on comparative grammar and etymology, but there are contributions on linguistic interpretation of text sources, epigraphy, and aspects of cultural history as well.

The journal is published by Harrassowitz Verlag and it usually appears biannually. The current editor-in-chiefs are Hannes Fellner, Robert Nedoma and Stefan Schumacher (University of Vienna).

External links
 

Indo-European linguistics works
Linguistics journals
Multilingual journals
English-language journals
French-language journals
German-language journals
Italian-language journals
Spanish-language journals
Publications established in 1949
Biannual journals
Harrassowitz Verlag academic journals